Carole Nash is a  motorcycle insurance brokers in the UK and Ireland. The company also provides insurance cover for classic cars and performance vehicles, as well as campervans.

History 

In 1985, after being made redundant for economic reasons by her previous employer, Carole Nash founded Carole Nash Insurance Consultants Ltd, using her redundancy cheque of £2,500. The company's first headquarters were located at Nash's own family home in Timperley, with business operations run from her kitchen table. Originally set up to look after the interests of vintage motorcycle owners, the business expanded to cover all types of motorbikes. By 1995, following a sustained period of growth, Carole Nash had 30,000 policyholders on its books.

Carole Nash opened its first office in Ireland in 1999. In 2004, the company acquired the motorcycle insurance arm of The Automobile Association, helping it to increase its customer portfolio to 230,000 policyholders. In December 2006, the business was sold by its founder to French insurance group Groupama for an undisclosed sum. Following the sale, David Newman was appointed as Chief Executive Officer in September 2007.

In May 2012 the company expanded into the classic motor industry with the launch of a specialist branch of the business tailored to meet the needs of classic and performance car owners. The company celebrated its 30th anniversary in 2015. To commemorate, a life-size replica of the first motorcycle ever insured by Carole Nash – an AJS 1927 – was unveiled, made entirely from cake and chocolate, and measuring two metres (length) by 0.9 metre (height). To this day, the owner is still insured through Carole Nash.

In 2017 Carole Nash was bought by The Ardonagh Group.

Key people 

Carole Nash

Founder. Sold the business to Groupama in 2006. She is still actively involved with the company, taking part in events and interviews during the company’s 30th anniversary celebrations. In 2012 Carole Nash was appointed an OBE for charitable services in the North West of England.

David Newman

David Newman was CEO of Carole Nash Insurance Consultants Ltd and Chairman of Carole Nash Legal Services LLP, one of the first approved Alternative Business Structures (ABS) allowed under the Legal Services Act 2007,

He is a chartered director and chartered marketer as well as a fellow of the Chartered Institute of Marketing and the Institute of Directors.  He also holds a diploma in Company Direction from the Institute of Directors.

He has been a non-executive director of the Insurance Fraud Bureau, a non-profit organisation funded by the insurance industry to detect and deter insurance fraud in the UK, since 2010.

Newman was named a finalist in the North West Director of the Year Awards 2015.

Ian Donaldson

Ian Donaldson is the current CEO of Carole Nash Insurance, Ian is also the CEO of Autonet, both are subsidiaries of the Ardonagh group.

Customer Council

In 2014 Carole Nash created its own Customer Council. Made up of eleven policyholders, the council offers real-time insight into the current areas that matter most to real bikers, allowing Carole Nash to get beneath the surface of how they can provide better care and product offering. The Customer Council were involved in the development of two new policies - 'Rider Cover' and 'Bikers Only'.

Partners 

Jonathan Rea races professionally for Kawasaki in the World Superbike Championship, where he was crowned champion in 2015. To celebrate, colleagues from Carole Nash's Irish offices changed their name to Jonathan Rea by deed poll.
Jonathan has been a brand ambassador for Carole Nash since 2013.

Leon Haslam currently competes in the British Superbike Championship for Kawasaki and is the son of retired MotoGP legend 'Rocket Ron' Haslam. Leon has been an ambassador for Carole Nash since 2014.

The Honda Ron Haslam Race School

After retiring from professional motorcycle racing, Ron Haslam set up his own race school at Donington Park with his wife Ann. Carole Nash has been a sponsor of the race school since 2014.

Ace Cafe

The Ace Cafe has played a notable role in motorcycle culture since it opened in its doors 1938. Carole Nash has sponsored the Ace Cafe for many years and regularly takes part in bike meets and ride-outs with them.

Shows

Carole Nash has helped nurture the motorcycle culture through their involvement with many of the UK and Ireland's biggest motorcycle shows and events.

The company has continued to grow its partnerships with Bauer Media and Mortons, who between them organise the majority of the motorcycle shows covering both current and vintage bikes.

Social responsibility 

To commemorate the 30th anniversary of the company, Carole Nash donated £30,000, shared out amongst five local charities; the Christie Hospital, North West Air Ambulance, The Counselling & Family Centre, Forever Manchester and Brake.

A further £30,000 was split across six Blood Bikes groups. Blood Bikes are a rapid response motorcycle-based charity, run by unpaid volunteers, who move urgent medical supplies and test samples to hospitals up and down the UK.

Insidebikes 

The company operates its own motorcycle news, guide and advice site, entitled Insidebikes. The site provides motorcycle-related news covering industry news, consumer issues and sport news from the MotoGP, World Superbikes and British Superbikes championships. A number of guides on new products, models and owning and riding advice are also featured.

Awards 

Carole Nash has been awarded a number of awards, including:

 Personal Lines Broking Innovation of the Year award for 'Bikers Only' at the British Insurance Awards 2016
Insurance Times Awards
Excellence in Motor Broking - 2015
Personal Lines Broker of the Year – 2015 
Brand Marketing Campaign of the Year - 2012 
Defaqto
Carole Nash Motorcycle Insurance rated as an 'excellent product' and given five-star rating – 2012, 2013, 2014, 2015, 2016 
RiDE Magazine, RiDER Power Survey:
Britain's Most Used Motorcycle Insurance Broker – 2002, 2003, 2004, 2006, 2007, 2008, 2009, 2010.
Insurance Age Awards:
Claims Initiative of the Year – 2004
British Insurance Awards:
Personal Lines Broker of the Year – 2003, The Training Award – 2003

References

External links 

Insurance companies of the United Kingdom
Financial services companies established in 1985
Companies based in Trafford
1985 establishments in the United Kingdom